Stratford station is a large interchange station linking London Underground, London Overground, DLR and most rail services in Stratford, east London, England.

Stratford station may also refer to:
Stratford railway station, Victoria, Australia. 
Stratford, Ontario railway station, Canada. 
Stratford station (Connecticut), Connecticut, United States. 
 Stratford Station Apartments, a residential colony at Centennial, Colorado, United States.

See also
Stratford International station, an interchange station linking the Docklands Light Railway to High Speed 1 in east London, England
Stratford High Street DLR station in east London, England
Stratford Old Town railway station, on the Stratford-upon-Avon and Midland Junction Railway, opened 1875 and closed 1952
Stratford-upon-Avon railway station
Stratford-upon-Avon Parkway railway station
Stratford-upon-Avon Racecourse Platform railway station